José Manuel Calderón may refer to:

José Calderón (basketball) (born 1981), Spanish basketball executive and former player
José Manuel Calderón (musician) (born 1941), Dominican musician
José Manuel Calderón (footballer) (born 2000), Spanish footballer
José Manuel Calderón (politician), Chilean politician, Secretary of the Navy during the rule of Francisco Ramón Vicuña

See also
 José Calderón (disambiguation)